Japanese football team Gainare Tottori's 2016 season.

Competitions

J. League

Emperor's Cup
Beat Fagiano Okayama Next in the first round.
Lost to Omiya Ardija in the 2nd round.

League table

J3 League

References

External links
 J.League official site

Gainare Tottori
Gainare Tottori seasons